Diego Martín Rossi Marachlian (born 5 March 1998) is a Uruguayan professional footballer who plays as a forward for Turkish Süper Lig club Fenerbahçe and the Uruguay national team.

Club career

Youth
Rossi began playing football as a child at the El Queso school in Solymar. At the age of six, Rossi moved to the Solymar Uruguay Sports Center, with which he competed in the Interbalnearian League of Youth Football. He demonstrated his ability in the club and caught the attention of Peñarol, where he joined their academy at the age of 12. Néstor Gonçalves discovered him and was invited to play a friendly tournament in Alegrete with the a team, where he eventually was offered a contract.

At the age of 14, Rossi was the top scorer for the team's under-14 team in the Uruguayan seven tier, where he was a top scorer in 2012 with 42 goals in 27 matches. The following year, Rossi joined the Peñarol youth team in the Uruguayan sixth division, where he scored 25 times in 17 appearances. With Penarol's U-15 team, Rossi helped the team win the Apertura Tournament and the Uruguayan U-15 Championship as well as the Fabian Lomineto Cup.

In 2014, he was the top scorer of the Uruguayan Premier Division Under-16 Tournament, scoring 17 goals in the first half of the year, where Peñarol came out champions of the U-16 Clausura Tournament.

On 7 April 2015, he was invited to train with the first-team squad of Peñarol for the first time, along with his teammates from the under-17 team Santiago Bueno and Federico Valverde.

He was promoted by Pablo Bengoechea to the first team for the 2015–16 season in August. Diego alternated the practices with their U-18 team and Peñarol's senior team, but he played with the U-17 club and in the Third or Fourth Division for the entirety of the season.

He finished 2015 helping the Peñarol's U-17 team win the Apertura U-17 Tournament, and after beating Danubio in a final in which he scored a goal. For the fourth consecutive year he was the top scorer of the championship, with 22 goals plus one in the final, although he played ten games in the Fourth and Third Division.

Peñarol
On 5 January 2016, Rossi began the preseason with the Peñarol first team. He debuted with the club on 16 January 2016, in the Bandes Cup final, where he came on in the 7th minute for Gabriel Leyes in a 1–0 victory against Cerro Porteño. Rossi made his debut with the club at the age of 17 years and 317 days old. At the end of the 2015–16, Rossi was demoted to the second team following a change in managerial leadership, where Bengoechea was sacked and Jorge Orosmán da Silva took over.

Following a series of poor results, da Silva called Rossi into the first team, where on 20 April 2016, he made his full debut with the club, playing against Sporting Cristal in the 2016 Copa Libertadores group stage match. He scored his first professional goal five days later in a 3–1 win against Rentistas.

Los Angeles FC
On 14 December 2017, Rossi was signed as a young designated player for Los Angeles FC of Major League Soccer, an expansion franchise that began play in 2018. On 4 March 2018, Rossi made his MLS debut in Seattle against Seattle Sounders FC. Rossi's goal in the 11th minute was the first goal in Los Angeles FC history. The goal was also the fastest goal by an expansion team in MLS history. On 8 August 2018, Rossi scored his first hat-trick in MLS during a U.S. Open Cup semifinal match against the Houston Dynamo, a game in which LAFC ultimately lost in penalty kicks.

On 18 July 2020, Rossi became the 13th MLS player and first LAFC player to score four goals in a match, doing so in a 6–2 victory over rivals LA Galaxy in the MLS is Back Tournament group stage.

Fenerbahçe (loan)
On 1 September 2021, it was announced that Rossi would join Süper Lig club Fenerbahçe on loan for the remainder of the 2021 season with an option to buy, making him the second Armenian-heritage footballer to play in Turkish league after Aras Özbiliz.

Fenerbahçe
On 15 April 2022, Fenerbahçe announced that they acquired Rossi on a permanent transfer. He signed a three-year contract, beginning with the 2022–23 season.

International career

Youth
Rossi began his international career for Uruguay with under-15 team and went on to earn caps for Uruguay's different age level national teams. He was part of Uruguay squad at 2013 South American U-15 Championship, 2015 South American U-17 Championship, 2017 South American U-20 Championship, and 2020 CONMEBOL Pre-Olympic Tournament. In total, he scored 28 goals in 82 matches for Uruguay's youth national teams.

Senior
On 18 September 2020, Rossi was included in Uruguay's 26-man preliminary squad for World Cup qualifying matches against Chile and Ecuador. On 5 October 2020, Rossi was included in the final squad as a replacement for injured Cristhian Stuani.

Personal life 
Rossi is of Italian descent through his paternal side and Armenian descent through his maternal side. Since 2018, he has received invitations to play for Armenia national team, which he refused given his desire to represent Uruguay. His younger brother Nicolás is also a professional footballer and has pledged for the Armenia national team.

Rossi earned his U.S. green card in February 2019. This status qualified him as a domestic player for MLS roster purposes.

Career statistics

Club

International

Scores and results list Uruguay's goal tally first, score column indicates score after each Rossi goal.

Honours
Peñarol
Primera División: 2015–16, 2017

Los Angeles FC
Supporters' Shield: 2019

Uruguay Youth
South American Youth Football Championship: 2017

Individual
MLS All-Star: 2019, 2021 
MLS is Back Tournament Golden Boot: 2020
MLS is Back Tournament Young Player of the Tournament: 2020
MLS is Back Tournament Best XI: 2020
MLS Golden Boot: 2020
MLS Young Player of the Year: 2020
MLS Best XI: 2020
CONCACAF Champions League Team of the Tournament: 2020
Best MLS Player ESPY Award: 2021

References

External links 

 
 

Living people
1998 births
Uruguayan people of Italian descent
Uruguayan people of Armenian descent
Association football forwards
Uruguayan footballers
Uruguay youth international footballers
Uruguay under-20 international footballers
Uruguay international footballers
Uruguayan Primera División players
Major League Soccer players
Süper Lig players
Designated Players (MLS)
Peñarol players
Los Angeles FC players
Fenerbahçe S.K. footballers
Uruguayan expatriate footballers
Uruguayan expatriate sportspeople in Turkey
Uruguayan expatriate sportspeople in the United States
Expatriate footballers in Turkey
Expatriate soccer players in the United States